August Gaul (October 22, 1869 – October 18, 1922) was a German sculptor and expressionism artist, born in Großauheim (now part of Hanau).

August Gaul was a founding member of the Berlin Secession. On close terms with art dealers like Bruno and Paul Cassirer, he became a leading figure in the Berlin art scene before World War I. Gaul died of cancer in Berlin in 1922.

Works of Art

 
Produced in Frankfurt, Germany for the 1904 Louisiana Purchase Exposition in St. Louis, August Gaul's "Durana" bronze eagle features hundreds of hand-forged bronze feathers and was the centerpiece of one of the many German exhibits at the fair. When the fair closed the statue weighing 2,500 pounds was purchased by John Wanamaker of Philadelphia for $10,000. The eagle was re-installed centrally in the Grand Court of what has become known as America's first department store, Wanamaker's. The Eagle quickly became the store's unofficial mascot and grew in iconic popular social context with the Philadelphian and suburban catchphrase "Meet me at the Eagle". When suburban branches of John Wanamaker's department stores opened in the 1950s and ’60s, the company installed various eagle statues in each one. The eagle sculpture still resides at the same location under ownership of Macy's and is an integral element of this store becoming the flagship within the chain.

References
 Der Tierbildhauer August Gaul, ed. Ursel Berger. Nicolai, Berlin 1999

External links

 Los Angeles County Museum of Art (LACMA) – 69 drawings, Collection August Gaul

1869 births
1922 deaths
Modern sculptors
Deaths from cancer in Germany
20th-century German sculptors
20th-century German male artists
19th-century German sculptors
German male sculptors
19th-century German male artists